Pasquale Esposito is an Italian-born American tenor. He has released ten albums and has toured internationally.

Early life and education
Esposito is originally from Naples, Italy. He has four sisters, and is the youngest out of the five siblings. At home, his family played the music of Enrico Caruso, who was also from Naples. He started singing when he was six and by age seven he was performing at church.

In 1998, he visited California and decided to move to America. His family was not supportive of his goal to relocate, after which he received a green card through an immigration lottery. After enrolling in ESL classes at Foothill College, Esposito started studying music at San Jose State University in San Jose, California. He graduated from the music program, with a degree in vocal performance, in 2009. While at San Jose State, he studied under Professor Joseph Frank.

Musical career

Performances

Esposito is a lyric tenor, whose work focuses on operatic pop with occasional forays into traditional opera. Musically, Esposito is inspired by the work of Claudio Baglioni, Enrico Caruso, Pavarotti, and Giuseppe Di Stefano. He performs in multiple languages, including Italian, Neapolitan, Spanish, and English. Between 2005 and 2006, Esposito toured both Italy and the United States in support of his album Naples... That's Amore! In 2007 he then toured with Gigi D'Alessio and Anna Tatangelo on the US leg of their world tour. After this he toured his own show of original compositions called Simply Pasquale! In 2009 he performed Volare at a San Francisco Giants game. Between that year and 2010, he toured internationally in support of his album A Brand New Me. He has also performed for the San Francisco Opera, the Mission San Carlos Borromeo de Carmelo, the Fort Smith Symphony, the National Steinbeck Center, and the Folsom Symphony, for which he performed a Christmas program entitled Bianco Natale.

PBS Specials
In 2015 Esposito starred in Pasquale Esposito Celebrates Enrico Caruso for PBS. This was his first PBS special, described as a "docuconcert" in which Esposito paid tribute to the work of Enrico Caruso. The concert section of the special was filmed at the historic Castello Giusso in Vico Equense on the Amalfi Coast and the documentary portions were filmed in both Italy and the United States. The special also featured Dino Natali as co-host and an interview with opera singer Placido Domingo. The special premiered on March 10, 2015. Part of the documentary contains Esposito reflecting on his experience growing up in the same neighborhood that Caruso lived in while in Italy. A CD and DVD version of the docu-concert entitled Pasquale Esposito Celebrates Enrico Caruso was also released for sale through PBS and is available on line.

In the Spring of 2018, Pasquale Esposito released his 2nd Public Television Special, titled Pasquale Esposito Celebrates Italian Piazzas on PBS. For the special, Esposito visited — and performed at — the central squares of several Italian cities, including Rome, Venice, Palermo, Amalfi and his hometown, Naples. He also brought along one of his young music students, Victoria McDowell to perform alongside him. The live concert was filmed in the prestigious Piazza del Plebiscito in Naples, Italy on September 3, 2016. Special guests that evening included legendary actress and singer Lina Sastri and Grammy nominated Lebanese-American soprano Mayssa Karaa. Esposito was accompanied on stage by the Orchestra Talenti Napoletani conducted by Adriano Pennino.The non-profit organization Notable Music and Arts Organization financed the project.

Pasquale Esposito released his 3rd PBS Special: "IL TEMPO" in November 2020 nationally on PBS stations. The release of his 4th PBS Christmas Special: "In the Spirit of Christmas" is set for release August 2021 followed by a North American Tour in November and December 2021.

Opera Debut - San Francisco Opera
In 2015, Pasquale Esposito made his successful Opera debut with San Francisco Opera in the world premiere of Marco Tutino's Two Women. The opera was based on a 1958 Alberto Moravia novel that Vittorio De Sica turned into a film vehicle for Sophia Loren. Esposito performed the principal role of Ragazzo del Popolo. The first scene of “Two Women” benefits from evocative settings of three traditional Roman songs, and near the end, the tenor Pasquale Esposito sings the World War II-era pop hit “La Strada nel Bosco” with airy charm. During the peace celebration at the end, tenor Pasquale Esposito, a popular Italian crooner in real life, hopped atop a box, sang a song, and made effective his SFO debut.

Albums
Esposito's album Naples... That's Amore! represented an Italian musical revue, which he had also directed and produced. His 2009 album A Brand New Me includes singing in both English and Italian, focusing on a pop music theme. Each of the tracks on the album were an original composition. His 2011 album Il Tempo was a double-CD that contains both Italian and Neapolitan standards and an original composition. In 2015, he released the companion album Pasquale Esposito Celebrates Enrico Caruso.  In 2018, Esposito released the companion album Pasquale Esposito Celebrates Italian Piazzas.  Pasquale recorded and released his 9th album Pasquale Esposito Celebrates The Spirit of Christmas in November 2019. In November 2020, Pasquale released the Il Tempo 10th Anniversary Edition along with the debut of his 3rd PBS Television Special: Il Tempo.

Discography
 My Passion (2000)
 My Destiny (2004)
 Naples...That's Amore! (2005)
 Il Fornaio: Authentic Italy, Vol. 1 (2008)
 A Brand New Me (2009)
 Il Tempo (2011)
 Pasquale Esposito Celebrates Enrico Caruso (2015)
 Pasquale Esposito Celebrates Italian Piazzas (2018)
 In the Spirit of Christmas (2019)
 Il Tempo 10th Anniversary Edition (2020)
 In the Spirit of Christmas - Television Special Edition with Bonus Tracks (2021)

Personal life
He lives in San Jose, California and Naples, Italy. He is an American citizen and serves on the advisory board of directors for the Little Italy San Jose Foundation. When not performing, he teaches voice lessons from his recording studio. He also founded Notable Music and Arts Organization in 2012, a music education non-profit. He is married and has three children.

References

External links

Year of birth missing (living people)
Living people
Italian tenors
Singers from California
People from San Jose, California
San Jose State University alumni
Musicians from Naples
Italian emigrants to the United States
Italian opera singers